Gnaphosa ukrainica is a ground spider species found in Ukraine, Russia and Turkmenistan.

See also 
 List of Gnaphosidae species

References

External links 

Gnaphosidae
Spiders of Central Asia
Spiders of Europe
Spiders of Russia
Spiders described in 1992